Benoît Croissant (born 9 August 1980) is a French former football player who retired in 2012. He has played his whole career as a centre defender. Having played for 8 clubs in 8 countries, he is considered a globetrotter.

He has been educated at the National technical centre of Clairefontaine for 3 years which has a high reputation of producing some of the most gifted French players.

Career

He played his early football career for Troyes AC where he stayed for 4 years before moving to England to play with Sheffield United in 2001. Sheffield manager Neil Warnock loaned him to Dutch club Stormvogels Telstar in 2002 for match experience and played in the talented pool called the eerste divisie. In 2003, he was eventually transferred to the Dutch side and signed a new 2-year contract. His last year in the Netherlands was terrible for Croissant as he was injured for almost the whole season.

He then decided to leave Europe and signed for Egyptian Premier League club Suez Cement (Asmant el-Suweis). However, the deal fell through and he then went to China and signed for Liaoning Whowin F.C. He stayed there few months before moving to Indianapolis Braves. The Braves were a promising side with a drive to progress into the MLS .

Croissant decided to move to a more competitive competition and signed for the Bahrain club Al-Najma in June 2007. In his first season with Al-Najma, he won the Bahraini King's Cup and participated in the AFC Cup 2008. In August 2007, he scored his first goal with the Bahraini club against Al Wakrah during the Gulf Cup in Abu Dhabi

He has played for Tampines Rovers in the Singapore S.League from November 2008 till December 2012. Despite having received several offers at the end of the years 2009 and 2010 from different clubs, including Australian side North Queensland Fury and the defeat of the Singapore Cup Final 2010, he decided to stay with the Rovers and won the S.League and the Singapore Charity Shield in 2011 and 2012 consecutively.

With the Rovers he participated for the second time in the AFC Cup 2011 and he scored an important opening goal in the away game against Victory SC in Maldives. The Rovers managed to progress to the last 16 where the played against Arbil SC in Iraq where they unfortunately lost after extra time.

He has won two S.League championships as well as two times the Singapore Charity Shield in 2011 and 2012 before hanging up his boots.

Career after Football

Benoît holds a master's degree in Business and Sport Management from Sheffield Hallam University and various UEFA recognized football coaching diplomas.

He is based in Singapore and the co-founder and director of a sports marketing and event management agency called Number 9 Sports Asia  and registered as FIFA Players’ agent from the Football Association of Singapore.

Benoît is also regularly working as a football pundit for different television channels in South East Asia covering matches of the FIFA World Cup, English Premier League, S.League, Malaysia Super League, Asian Champions League, etc.

Honours

Club
Al-Najma
Bahraini King's Cup (1): 2007

Tampines Rovers
S.League (2): 2011, 2012
Singapore Charity Shield (2): 2011, 2012

References

External links
 
 Benoît Croissant Interview
 Have boots will travel

1980 births
Living people
People from Vitry-le-François
ES Troyes AC players
French footballers
Association football defenders
Sheffield United F.C. players
Singapore Premier League players
Tampines Rovers FC players
Expatriate footballers in Singapore
Sportspeople from Marne (department)
Footballers from Grand Est
French expatriate footballers
French expatriate sportspeople in England
INF Clairefontaine players
French expatriate sportspeople in Singapore
French expatriate sportspeople in the Netherlands
Expatriate footballers in the Netherlands
Expatriate footballers in England
Expatriate footballers in Bahrain
Expatriate footballers in China
Expatriate soccer players in the United States
French expatriate sportspeople in China
French expatriate sportspeople in Bahrain
French expatriate sportspeople in the United States
Association football agents
Alumni of Sheffield Hallam University